William Stitt Poole III (born May 1, 1975) is an American attorney and politician who served as a member of the Alabama House of Representatives for the 63rd district from 2011 to 2021.

Early life and education
Poole was born in New Orleans, Louisiana. He earned a Bachelor of Science degree in business management from the University of Alabama in 1997 and a Juris Doctor from the University of Alabama School of Law in 2004.

Career 
After graduating from law school, he took a job as a civil attorney for the city of Tuscaloosa, Alabama. He became a city attorney and prosecutor for Brookwood, Alabama, and also worked for the Pharmaceutical Research and Manufacturers of America and as a staff assistant to the House Ways and Means Committee in the United States House of Representatives.

In 2010, Poole ran for the 63rd district of the Alabama House of Representatives which was represented by Robert J. Bentley. Poole defeated attorney John Fisher for the Republican Party nomination, and Democratic professor Susan Pace Hamill in the general election.

In 2013, House Speaker Mike Hubbard appointed Poole as chair of the House Ways and Means Education Committee. Following Hubbard's criminal conviction in 2016, Poole considered running for speaker, though he opted against it. After Donald Trump announced that he selected United States Senator Jeff Sessions of Alabama to become United States attorney general, Bentley considered appointing Poole to the position.

Personal life
Poole was raised in Dayton, Alabama. He and his wife, Niccole, have three children. Poole's father, Bill II, served as a city attorney for Demopolis, Alabama.

References

External links

Alabama lawyers
Living people
Republican Party members of the Alabama House of Representatives
People from Marengo County, Alabama
People from New Orleans
University of Alabama School of Law alumni
1975 births
21st-century American politicians
21st-century American lawyers